The Bauhaus, formal name Staatliches Bauhaus, was a German school of design which existed from 1919 to 1933.

Bauhaus may also refer to:

 Bauhaus (band), English gothic rock band
 Bauhaus (company), international company operating retail stores
 Bauhaus (magazine), German arts magazine (1926–1931)
 Bauhaus (typeface), font inspired by Herbert Bayer's experimental Universal typeface
 Bauhaus Museum (disambiguation), multiple museums
 Bauhaus Project (computing), software research project carried out by a consortium of universities and companies
 Bauhaus Stairway, oil painting by German artist Oskar Schlemmer
 Bauhaus University, Weimar, university located in Weimar, Germany
 Bauhaus and its Sites in Weimar, Dessau and Bernau, World Heritage Site in Germany
 8502 Bauhaus, Main-belt Asteroid discovered on 14 October 1990
 Phil Bauhaus (born 1994), German cyclist

See also
 BaoHaus, a restaurant